Montreal Indians was a Canadian football team in the Interprovincial Rugby Football Union. The team played in the 1936 and 1937 seasons.

Canadian Football Hall of Famers
Abe Eliowitz
John Ferraro

IRFU season-by-season

References
CFLdb - Montreal Indians

Interprovincial Rugby Football Union teams
Defunct Canadian football teams
Ind